"Coconut Dracula" is a single by American rock band Islander. The song was released as the first single from the band's debut album, Violence & Destruction.

Music video
The video for the song begins with a group of kids wearing masks entering an abandoned building. As two of the kids cause further damage to the building, one of them breaks away and finds smoke flares. Two of the kids exit the building before walking around the streets of a city. One of the kids breaks off onto his own, wandering the streets. The exploits of the children are inter-cut with footage of the band performing the song and driving at night.

Track listing
 "Coconut Dracula" – 4:07

Charts

Personnel
 Mikey Carvajal – vocals
 Chris Doot – bass
 Eric Frazier – drums
 Andrew Murphy – guitar

References

2014 debut singles
Islander (band) songs
Victory Records singles
2014 songs